Stewart Raymond Ferebee (born 6 September 1960) was an English footballer who played in the Football League for York City, Darlington and Halifax Town. A forward, Ferebee also played non-league football for clubs including Harrogate Railway Athletic, Scarborough, Harrogate Town, for whom he scored 49 goals from 173 matches, 40 from 128 in league competition, in two spells with the club, and Whitley Bay, for whom he scored 52 goals from 137 appearances.

He attended Newcastle University.

References

1960 births
Living people
Footballers from Carshalton
English footballers
Association football forwards
Harrogate Railway Athletic F.C. players
York City F.C. players
Scarborough F.C. players
Harrogate Town A.F.C. players
Whitley Bay F.C. players
Darlington F.C. players
Halifax Town A.F.C. players
English Football League players
Northern Football League players
Northern Premier League players
Alumni of Newcastle University